The Azat Civil Movement of Kazakhstan is an unregistered political party in Kazakhstan. It was founded on 30 June–1 July 1990 and is currently being led by Kazakh composer, political activist Hasen Qojahmetov. It was periodically merged into Azat Republican Party of Kazakhstan from 11 October 1992 to 20 November 1992 in an attempt for reunification with the party which was split on 5 September 1991 due to a disagreement in assessing the political and economic course of the country's leadership.

References

Political parties established in 1990
Political parties in Kazakhstan
Pro-independence parties in the Soviet Union